Pietro Capelli or Pietro Cappelli (born circa 1700, died 1724 or 1727) was an Italian painter of the Rococo, active in his native city of Naples. He trained under Francesco Solimena. He was active in quadratura, but also painted capricci and canvases with landscapes.

He was a rival of Leonardo Coccorante.  His father, Giuseppe Capelli, was a scenic designer at the Teatro San Bartolomeo in Naples. His brother, Giuseppe Cappelli (or Capelli) was a painter in Rome of scenographic decoration (theatrical decorations). Grossi states that he was so full of imagination, and fast at painting, that he did not even sketch beforehand for his works.

References

1720s deaths
18th-century Neapolitan people
18th-century Italian painters
Italian male painters
Painters from Naples
Italian Baroque painters
Italian vedutisti
Rococo painters
Quadratura painters
Year of birth unknown
Year of birth uncertain
1700s births
18th-century Italian male artists